Phare du Créac'h or Kreac'h lighthouse or Créac'h lighthouse is a lighthouse in Ushant, France. It is the most powerful in Europe and one of the most powerful in the world. It stands close to La Jument lighthouse and the Nividic lighthouse. It has been a listed monument since 2011.

See also

 List of lighthouses in France

Gallery

References

External links

France Sees Its Heritage in Its Crumbling Lighthouses - New York Times
Fiche « Le Créac'h » sur le site de la DDE du Finistère. 

Lighthouses completed in 1863
Creac'h
Monuments historiques of Finistère
Ushant